Mordechai Geldman (16 April 1946 – 8 October 2021) was an Israeli poet, non-fiction writer, artist, art critic and curator, and psychologist. His poems were translated into many languages, including the collection Years I Walked at Your Side published in 2018 by SUNY Press. He received awards including the Bialik Prize for his life achievements.

Biography
Geldman was born at a displaced persons camp in Munich to Polish parents who had survived the Holocaust. His family immigrated to Israel in 1949 and settled in Tel Aviv, where he lived ever since. He studied world literature and clinical psychology at Bar Ilan University. He was an independent psychotherapist using psychoanalytical methods.

Geldman published 18 poetry books, a book of short stories, and six non-fiction books. A two-volume collection from his poetry books was published in 2011. His last poetry book is the third volume, of works written until 2019. His poems were translated into many languages, including Chinese and Japanese. His book Becoming One was translated into Portuguese (Teoria Do Um) and published in Portugal in 2017. A large collection of his poems in English was published in 2018 by SUNY Press of the State University of New York, titled Years I Walked at Your Side in translations by Tsipi Keller.

Geldman's poetry is philosophical, psychological and existentialistic. It combines literary Hebrew and everyday language, even using some slang. His later poetry tends to be meditative and includes many haiku, influenced by Zen Buddhist aesthetics and philosophy. His poetry has many aspects, including lyrical, philosophical, sensual, erotic, religious and ironic. He was a representative of poetry from Israel at international events such as the Biennale of Poetry in Liège, Belgium, in 1995, the Israeli Cultural Season in France in 1998, the Second Tokyo Poetry Festival in 2011, and the poetry festival  in Baku, Azerbaijan, in 2019.

Geldman's non-fiction books deal with subjects as the self in psychoanalytic theories and in Yoga and Buddhism, psychoanalytic interpretation of literature, such as doubles, and symmetries in Shakespeare's plays, and his favorite Israeli poets and artists.

As a visual artist, Geldman was engaged in plastic arts, ceramics and photography. His photographs were exhibited at such places as the Tel Aviv Museum of Art. Geldman was an art critic of the Israeli daily Haaretz, and curated exhibitions for many Israeli artists.

Geldman died of cancer at age 75.

Zvika Nir, the chairman of the Writers' Association, summarised:

Awards 
 Chomsky Prize for Poetry (1983)
  Prime Minister's Prize for Hebrew Writers (1996)
 Brenner Prize for literature (1997)
 Amichai Prize (2004)
 Bialik Prize for his life achievements (2010)

Publications 
Geldman published works in many genres, including:

Poetry 
 Sea Time, Land Time (1970)
 Bird (1975)
 Window (1980)
 Songs 1966-1983 (1983)
 Milano (1988)
 Eye  (1993)
 Book of Ask (1997)
 Time (1997) with art by Moshe Gershuni
 Mourning Songs (2000) with art by Pesach Slabosky
 Oh My Dear Wall (2000)
 The Heart's Poem (2004)
 Tamir's Poems (2007), under the pseudonym Daniel Kasif
 Years I Walked at Your Side" (2011), in 2 volumes. A wide collection from Geldman's poetry books and new poems.
  Becoming One (2013)
 Night Line (2015)Years I Walked at your Side (2019), 3rd volume. A collection from Geldman's poems written 2013–2019
Crescent on a Boat (Haiku collection) (2019)
 Teoria Do Um (תורת הייחוד) (2016), in 2 volumes. Translated to Portuguese by Joao Paulo Esteves Da Silva. Portugal: Douda Correria
 Years I Walked at Your Side (2018), a  collection from Geldman's poetry. Translated to English by Tsipi Keller. Excelsior Editions, State University New York Press
 Wine on Ice, English poems, Demer Press (Netherlands), 2021

Non-fiction 
 Dark Mirror (1995)
 Psychoanalytic Criticism (1998)
 Eating Fire, Drinking Fire (2002)
 The True Self and the Self of Truth (2006)
 In the Silver Mirror: Bianca Eshel Gershuny (2007)
 Mirrors and Doubles: Shakespeare as a psychoanalyst (2019)

Catalogues 
 Sharon Landscapes: Helen Berman (2009)
 Dad's Bird: Naomi Brickman (2012)
 The Source of Light: Einan Cohen (2015)

Prose 
 Neighbours and Other Perverts (2014)

References

External links 
 Mordechai Geldman  Snunit
 Geldman, Mordechai: Years I Walked at Your Side: Selected Poems, SUNY Press, 2018, 

1946 births
2021 deaths
20th-century German Jews
Bar-Ilan University alumni
Brenner Prize recipients
Deaths from cancer in Israel
German emigrants to Israel
Hebrew-language poets
Israeli non-fiction writers
Israeli people of Polish-Jewish descent
Israeli photographers
Israeli poets
Israeli psychologists
Israeli psychotherapists
Polish expatriates in Germany
Writers from Tel Aviv